Deutschlandfunk Kultur (abbreviated to DLF Kultur or DKultur) is a culture-oriented radio station and part of Deutschlandradio, a set of national radio stations in Germany. Initially named DeutschlandRadio Berlin, the station was renamed Deutschlandradio Kultur on 1 April 2005.  The present name was adopted on 1 May 2017.

The station's studios are in what was the RIAS building at Hans-Rosenthal-Platz in Schöneberg, Berlin.

History
Deutschlandfunk Kultur's roots go back to the first Deutschlandsender, set up in 1926. After World War II, Deutschlandsender became the main national radio station of the German Democratic Republic (GDR), with programming aimed at all of Germany. In the 1970s it was merged with the main Berlin station Berliner Welle and renamed Stimme der DDR - "Voice of the GDR". It lasted until February 1990 when it again became Deutschlandsender, and in May 1990 it merged with Radio DDR 2. The merged entity was named Deutschlandsender Kultur.

In 1994, German broadcasting authorities reorganised radio services of the former GDR and the Federal Republic of Germany. Deutschlandfunk in the west (based in Cologne) and RIAS in Berlin were merged with Deutschlandsender to form Deutschlandradio. In the new structure, Deutschlandfunk became the national information radio station. Deutschlandsender became "DeutschlandRadio Berlin".

On 7 March 2005, DeutschlandRadio Berlin became "Deutschlandradio Kultur".

The name was changed again on 1 May 2017, when the station became "Deutschlandfunk Kultur".

Programmes
Deutschlandfunk Kultur is noted for its radio plays and documentaries. The station's programmes also cover arts, culture, and science. Deutschlandfunk Kultur carries no commercial advertising.

Every Sunday just before midday, the station broadcasts the sound of the Freedom Bell in Berlin along with a reading of part of the Declaration of Independence. The bell was presented by America to the city of Berlin in 1950 as a symbol of anti-communism, and was inspired by the American Liberty Bell. The tradition of broadcasting the bell was originally begun by RIAS, an antecedent of DLF Kultur.

Transmission technology
Deutschlandfunk Kultur is transmitted on FM, DAB and DVB-S. The station's longwave broadcasts on 177 kHz from the Oranienburg transmitter ceased on 31 December 2014.

The station's output is livestreamed on the Deutschlandradio website, and individual programmes are available as podcasts.

References

External links

 Deutschlandfunk Kultur website  
 ARD Radio  

Deutschlandradio
German radio networks
Radio stations in Germany
Radio stations established in 1990
Radio stations established in 1994
Mass media in Berlin